Sedgwick is a statutory town in Sedgwick County, Colorado, United States. The population was 146 at the 2010 census.

History
The town was named for Fort Sedgwick, which was named after John Sedgwick, who was a major general in the Union Army during the American Civil War.

Geography
Sedgwick is located at  (40.935706, -102.525272).

Climate
According to the Köppen Climate Classification system, Sedgwick has a semi-arid climate, abbreviated "BSk" on climate maps. July 1954 was one of Sedgwick's warmest months to date.

Demographics

As of the census of 2000, there were 191 people, 81 households, and 55 families residing in the town. The racial makeup of the town was 95.29% White, 1.05% African American, 2.09% Asian, 1.05% from other races, and 0.52% from two or more races. Hispanic or Latino of any race were 2.62% of the population.

There were 81 households, out of which 30.9% had children under the age of 18 living with them, 63.0% were married couples living together, 3.7% had a female householder with no husband present, and 30.9% were non-families. 30.9% of all households were made up of individuals, and 16.0% had someone living alone who was 65 years of age or older.  The average household size was 2.36 and the average family size was 2.91.

In the town, the population was spread out, with 26.2% under the age of 18, 4.2% from 18 to 24, 25.1% from 25 to 44, 24.1% from 45 to 64, and 20.4% who were 65 years of age or older.  The median age was 41 years. For every 100 females, there were 117.0 males.  For every 100 females age 18 and over, there were 113.6 males.

The median income for a household in the town was $26,875, and the median income for a family was $30,313. Males had a median income of $19,792 versus $16,042 for females. The per capita income for the town was $13,903.  About 7.7% of families and 9.0% of the population were below the poverty line, including 9.8% of those under the age of eighteen and 8.0% of those 65 or over.

See also

Outline of Colorado
Index of Colorado-related articles
State of Colorado
Colorado cities and towns
Colorado counties

References

External links

Town of Sedgwick contacts
CDOT map of the Town of Sedgwick

Towns in Sedgwick County, Colorado
Towns in Colorado